Gary Donnellan (born 3 July 1962) is an English former footballer who played as a midfielder in the Football League for Reading.

Career
Donnellan started his career as an apprentice at Chelsea, before being signed by Watford in 1980. Having only made one appearance for The Hornets, in the Football League Group Cup, he moved to Reading, with whom he made 41 appearances in the Football League Third Division over the next two seasons.

He then joined Wealdstone, and was a regular in the side that won the 1984–85 Alliance Premier League–FA Trophy "double". In the latter part of the 1986–87 season, Donnellan followed Wealdstone manager Brian Hall to Isthmian League club Yeovil Town and helped them finish as runners-up. He contributed to their Isthmian League and Cup double in his first full season, and made 47 appearances in the Conference over the next two seasons, taking his totals to 129 appearances and 18 goals in all competitions. Towards the end of the 1989–90 season, he was transferred to Enfield, struggling at the bottom of the Conference, for a club record £20,000. He played eight times, scoring once, as his new team were relegated. He later went on to represent Slough Town and Hendon.

Personal life
Donnellan was born to Irish parents in Paddington, London. His brother Leo played football professionally, as have Leo's sons Shaun and Leo junior. Donnellan began working in financial services in 1990, and since 2004 has worked for independent financial advisers Kingsway Wealth Management.

References

1962 births
Living people
Footballers from Kensington
English footballers
Association football midfielders
Chelsea F.C. players
Watford F.C. players
Reading F.C. players
Wealdstone F.C. players
Yeovil Town F.C. players
Enfield F.C. players
Slough Town F.C. players
Hendon F.C. players
English Football League players
National League (English football) players
Isthmian League players